Visitors to the de facto Republic of Abkhazia must obtain a visa unless they come from one of the visa exempt countries. In addition, citizens belonging to members of the Community for Democracy and Rights of Nations may visit Abkhazia without a visa.

As part of organized tourist groups from travel companies registered in Abkhazia or in Russia, tourists from all countries (except Georgia) can visit Abkhazia without an Abkhazian visa by land only through Russia, for a period of no more than 24 hours. For an extension of stay in Abkhazia, an extension is required for an additional fee or a requirement to leave Abkhazia under the threat of deportation to Russia and a fine to compensate for the costs of transportation during deportation.

Visa policy map

Visa exemption 

Citizens of the following countries and territories can visit Abkhazia without a visa:

Simplified visa issuance 
In the simplified visa regime, citizens of the following countries have a visa (tourist or business visa only) Abkhazia is issued quickly and without unnecessary questions, with the exception of some countries, such as Syria or Venezuela. For countries such as Syria or Venezuela, a de jure simplified visa was introduced to maintain good bilateral relations, and for other countries for the possible subsequent recognition of Abkhazia's independence on their part. De facto citizens of, for example, Syria or Venezuela have some special questions to the authorities of Abkhazia before issuing them a visa. The visa of Abkhazia is paid.

Tourism groups

Tourists from all countries (except Georgia) can visit Abkhazia for a period not exceeding 24 hours as part of an organized tourist group.

Special instructions 

If, when entering Georgia (by land, by air or by sea), Georgian border guards find an Abkhazian visa, Abzakh stamps or a stamp of Russian checkpoints on the border with Abkhazia in your passport, you are very likely to be fined, and often will not be allowed into the country additionally. Sometimes, in addition to a fine, criminal proceedings are initiated against some foreigners who have the above stamps or marks from checkpoints on the Abkhaz-Russian border on their passport, for illegal border crossing under the laws of Georgia. Since Georgia considers Abkhazia its territory. Then, in addition to a fine and deportation from Georgia, you may even face imprisonment or a larger fine in rare cases.

It is possible for nationals of third-countries (all except Georgian citizens) to cross from Georgia to Abkhazia and vice versa, as a border control is present in the Zugdidi area ("Ingur" checkpoint). In order to do so, one must simply apply online for an e-permit that can be printed and shown at the Georgian-Abkhazian border. Nevertheless, the departure from Georgia to Abkhazia is de facto free, since Georgia considers Abkhazia to be its part, however, it will be necessary to return from Abkhazia only through Georgia, otherwise the Georgian side will consider that you left the country illegally.

Abkhazia can otherwise only be reached by land through Russia. Despite the presence of seaports and several airports and airfields, there is no sea or air passenger communication with the outside world (even with Russia) in Abkhazia, the railway network though, has been repaired and is currently running services from Sokhumi to Sochi and seasonal summer services connect sporadically Moscow to Sokhumi. The territory of Abkhazia has not been controlled by the Georgian authorities since 1992, since the beginning of the war between these countries.

History

Citizens of all countries (except Georgia) could visit Abkhazia without a visa from 15 June to 1 August 2018.

Visitors statistics 
The Republic of Abkhazia is one of the most visited partially recognized countries by tourists in the world. The majority of foreigners visiting Abkhazia are from the former republics of the USSR (modern Post-Soviet space). They visit Abkhazia, as it is a cheap country for beach and mountain tourism and with subtropical nature. The country also has developed tourism in caves and gorges, for urban exploration in abandoned and destroyed objects, as well as sex tourism (de jure illegal in Abkhazia).

For example, by the end of 2021, Abkhazia was visited by over 5 million 177 thousand Russian citizens, not counting other foreigners.

Citizens of the Russian Federation

See also

Visa requirements for Abkhaz citizens
Visa policy of Georgia
Visa policy of Artsakh
Visa policy of Russia
Visa policy of South Ossetia
Visa policy of Transnistria

References

Abkhazia
Foreign relations of Abkhazia